Emden is an unincorporated village in eastern Shelby County, Missouri, United States. It is located on Route 168 approximately nine miles east of Shelbyville. There is a post office there, and two churches, plus houses and a few abandoned storefront buildings.

History
Emden was originally called "Dennison's Corner", and under the latter name got its start in the late 1880s when J. H. Dennison opened a country store at the site. The post office at Emden has been in operation since 1888. The present name is a transfer from Emden, Germany.

References
	

Unincorporated communities in Shelby County, Missouri
Unincorporated communities in Missouri